Acid: Can You Jack? is a 2005 compilation album released by Soul Jazz Records. The album compiles acid house music from the Chicago era from labels such as Trax and DJ International.

Release
Acid: Can You Jack was released by Soul Jazz Records on June 6, 2005. The album was later re-released with a slightly altered track list and a digital download.

Reception

From contemporary reviews, Daniel Siwek of XLR8R declared that the album "resembles a playlist from the Music Box, Ron Hardy's legendary club" declaring that "Phuture Jacks" and "I've Lost Control" were "just a few of the classics included" Justin Hopper of Pittsburgh City Paper commented that the album was a "highly listenable document" specifically praising the tracks by Phuture, Larry Heard and Marshall Jefferson. Hopper concluded that the album showed the genre "Leaving behind the million-dollar studio sound that house has become, this document is of a time when dance music's sensibility was raw, powerful, and purpose-driven" Jess Harvell of Pitchfork described the album as "is a strange mix of B-sides and lesser-known tracks with a few classics thrown in, but it still manages to hit most of the major acid tropes" and found that the genre "gets a little boring and samey in isolation and repetition" suggesting first-time listeners to try the Trax Records mix or Warp's Warp 10+1: Influences. Jim Carroll of the Irish Times gave the album four stars, noting that some tracks "are showing their age, but Soul Jazz's brilliantly compiled retrospective of acid's defining age highlight such flashbacks to relish as the subterranean stabs of Phuture's Acid Tracks, the hypnotic voodoo of Virgo Four's Take Me Higher and the dark, swirling pops of Tyree's Acid Over." Tom Leo of O Globo described the album as a collection of seminal songs that would trigger the acid house revolution in the United Kingdom.

Tracklisting
Tracklisting adapted from the liner notes of the album.

Disc 1

Disc 2

Credits
Credits adapted from the liner notes.
 Stuart Baker – compiler, interviewer
 Tim Lawrence – sleeve notes
 Angela Scott – licensing
 Adrian Self  – sleeve design
 Qwaint Biskette – sleeve design
 Duncan Cowell – mastering
 Pete Reilly – mastering
 Pierce Smith – repro man

References

Sources
 
 
 
 
 

2005 compilation albums
Soul Jazz Records compilation albums
Acid house albums
House music compilation albums